The 2017 Cork Premier Intermediate Hurling Championship was the 14th staging of the Cork Premier Intermediate Hurling Championship since its establishment by the Cork County Board in 2004. The draw for the opening round took place on 11 December 2016. The championship began on 30 April 2017 and ended on 8 October 2017.

On 8 October 2017, Kanturk won the championship following a 0-17 to 1-12 defeat of Mallow in the final. This was their first championship title in the grade.

Chris O'Leary from the Valley Rovers club was the championship's top scorer with 3-32.

Teams

A total of 16 teams contested the Premier Intermediate Championship, including 15 teams from the 2016 premier intermediate championship and one promoted from the 2016 intermediate championship.

Team changes

To Championship

Promoted from the Cork Intermediate Hurling Championship
 Fr. O'Neill's

From Championship

Promoted to the Cork Senior Hurling Championship
 Bandon

Results

Round 1

Round 2A

Round 2B

Round 3

Relegation play-offs

Quarter-finals

Semi-finals

Final

Championship statistics

Scoring events

Widest winning margin: 27 points
Fermoy 4-22 - 0-07 Tracton (Round 2B)
Most goals in a match: 8
Fr. O'Neill's 5-17 - 3-20 Castlelyons (Round 2B)
Most points in a match: 43
Kanturk 1-22 - 0-21 Charleville (Round 2A)
Most goals by one team in a match: 5
Fr. O'Neill's 5-17 - 3-20 Castlelyons (Round 2B)
Mallow 5-18 - 1-21 Blarney (Round 2A)
Most goals scored by a losing team: 3
Castlelyons 3-2- - 5-17 Fr. O'Neill's (Round 2B)
Most points scored by a losing team: 21 
Blarney 1-21 - 5-18 Mallow (Round 2A)
Charleville 0-21 - 1-22 Kanturk (Round 2A)

Top scorers

Top scorer overall

Top scorers in a single game

Miscellaneous

 On 19 July 2017, Valley Rovers and Blarney contest the first competitive club game at the newly-refurbished Páirc Uí Chaoimh.
 Kanturk become the first team from the Duhallow Division to gain promotion to the Cork Senior Hurling Championship.

References

External links
 2017 Cork PIHC results 

Cork Premier Intermediate Hurling Championship
Cork Premier Intermediate Hurling Championship